Pierre Roger (born 8 December 1983 in La Flèche, Sarthe) is a backstroke swimmer from France, who won the bronze medal in the men's individual 100 metres backstroke event at the 2002 European Championships in Berlin, Germany. He represented his native country at the 2004 Summer Olympics in Athens, Greece.

References
 
 

1983 births
Living people
People from La Flèche
French male backstroke swimmers
Swimmers at the 2004 Summer Olympics
Swimmers at the 2008 Summer Olympics
Olympic swimmers of France
European Aquatics Championships medalists in swimming
Sportspeople from Sarthe